Roland Gutierrez (born September 1, 1970) is an American attorney and a Democratic member of the Texas Senate who represents District 19.

Gutierrez is a graduate of the University of Texas at San Antonio and St. Mary's University School of Law, also in San Antonio.

While serving in the Texas House, Gutierrez chaired the House Committee on Defense and Veterans' Affairs on appointment from Republican House Speaker Joe Straus, also of San Antonio. In 2020, Gutierrez, ran for Texas Senate, District 19 against incumbent Republican Pete Flores.  On November 3, 2020, Gutierrez defeated Flores, winning District 19 with 50% of the vote to 47% for Flores.

Electoral history
2020

2018

2016

References

External links
 
Legislative page
Campaign page

|-

Living people
Democratic Party Texas state senators
Democratic Party members of the Texas House of Representatives
1970 births
Hispanic and Latino American state legislators in Texas
21st-century American politicians
Politicians from San Antonio
University of Texas at San Antonio alumni
St. Mary's University School of Law alumni